Cleburne County is the name of two counties in the United States:

 Cleburne County, Alabama
 Cleburne County, Arkansas